Phantom Ship may refer to:

 Ghost ship, a vessel with no living crew aboard
 Phantom Ship (island), in Crater Lake, Oregon, U.S.
 The Phantom Ship, an 1839 novel by Frederick Marryat 
 The Phantom Ship (film), a 1936 animated short film
 Phantom Ship, a shortened version in the U.S. of the 1935 British film The Mystery of the Mary Celeste

See also
 
Ghost Ship (disambiguation)